Lotte Wæver (born 17 February 1942) is a Danish former actress and television presenter.

Career

Television 
During her time in university, Wæver worked as one of the first female continuity announcers in Danmarks Radio (DR).

She is best known for presenting the Eurovision Song Contest in Copenhagen in 1964, a position for which she says she was chosen over her peers because of her willingness to do it.

The contest was famously overshadowed by a political protest from a man who trespassed onto the stage holding a banner reading "Boycott Franco and Salazar". In an interview in 2001, Wæver revealed that while she was visibly shaken by the protester, the incident did not affect her in the slightest because, as the presenter of the contest, when the light above the camera was on, her attention was focused on the camera.

Commenting on the significance of presenting the largest event hosted by DR at the time, she was nostalgic when thinking how primitive and technologically innocent it was, adding that the concert was "much bigger than she had imagined. It is something else now."

Film 
Wæver's first acting role was as Ellen in the 1969 film Midt i en jazztid, which represented Denmark at that year's Moscow International Film Festival.

She also contributed to the 1977 film Aftenlandet, which represented Denmark at that year's Moscow International Film Festival.

Later life 
Wæver left DR in 1971 to become a high school teacher.

In an interview with DR in 2014 to celebrate the 50th anniversary of the first Eurovision Song Contest held in Copenhagen, she revealed that she does not watch the Eurovision Song Contest, except for the end of the final to hear the winning song, because of what she believes is its pride and monstrosity.

Filmography

Television

Film

See also
List of Eurovision Song Contest presenters

References

External links 
 

1942 births
Living people
Danish actresses
Danish television personalities
Danish television presenters
Danish schoolteachers
Danish women television presenters